Kailash  Gahlot (born  11 March 1974) is the Transport & Environment minister of Delhi and a member of  the Sixth Legislative Assembly of Delhi in India. He represents the Najafgarh constituency of New Delhi and is a member of the  Aam Aadmi Party political party and is a cabinet minister of Arvind Kejriwal led Delhi government.

Early life and education
Kailash  Gahlot was born in New Delhi. He attended the University of Delhi and  attained Bachelor of Arts, Bachelor of Laws, Master of Laws  degrees.

Political career
Kailash  Gahlot is transport minister in Delhi government and represents the  Najafgarh constituency and is a  member of the Aam Aadmi Party political party & is the minister of Revenue, Administrative Reforms, Information &Technology, Law, Justice & Legislative Affairs, Transport and Environment.

Since 01 Feb. 2015 he is a Member of the Sixth Legislative Assembly of Delhi.

Cabinet Minister, Delhi
He is a cabinet minister in the Third Kejriwal ministry and holds the charge of below listed departments of the Government of Delhi.
 Transport
 Revenue
 Law & Justice
 Legislative Affairs
 Information & Technology
 Administrative Reforms

In 2023, he was also allotted the portfolio of Finance and planning departments.

Electoral performance

See also

 Aam Aadmi Party
 Delhi Legislative Assembly
 Najafgarh (Delhi Assembly constituency)
 Politics of India
 Sixth Legislative Assembly of Delhi

References 

1974 births
Aam Aadmi Party politicians from Delhi
Delhi MLAs 2015–2020
Delhi MLAs 2020–2025
Living people
People from New Delhi